The 2016 East Carolina Pirates football team represented East Carolina University in the 2016 NCAA Division I FBS football season. They were led by first-year head coach Scottie Montgomery and played their home games at Dowdy–Ficklen Stadium. This was East Carolina's third season as members of the East Division of the American Athletic Conference. They finished the season 3–9, 1–7 in American Athletic play to finish in a three-way tie for fourth place in the East Division.

Schedule

Schedule source:

Note: ‡ The game vs. Navy was originally scheduled for October 13 (Thursday) but was postponed due to flooding from Hurricane Matthew; it was rescheduled to Saturday, November 19.

Game summaries

Western Carolina

NC State

at South Carolina

at Virginia Tech

UCF

This game was notable for about a score of the band members taking a knee during the national anthem. It received widespread coverage, including on CNN, Fox News, and NBC.

at South Florida

at Cincinnati

UConn

at Tulsa

SMU

Navy

at Temple

References

East Carolina
East Carolina Pirates football seasons
East Carolina Pirates football